The 1942 Massachusetts general election was held on November 3, 1942, throughout Massachusetts. Primary elections took place on September 15.

At the federal level, Republican Incumbent Henry Cabot Lodge Jr. was reelected to the United States Senate over Democratic U.S. Representative Joseph E. Casey and Republicans won ten of fourteen seats in the United States House of Representatives. 

In the race for Governor, Republican incumbent Leverett Saltonstall defeated Democrat Roger Putnam. Overall, Republicans won four of the six elected state-wide offices and both houses of the Massachusetts General Court.

Governor

Republican Incumbent Leverett Saltonstall defeated Democratic Mayor of Springfield, Massachusetts Roger Putnam.

Lieutenant Governor
In the race for lieutenant governor, Republican incumbent Horace T. Cahill defeated Democratic Mayor of Medford John C. Carr. Both were unopposed in their parties’ primaries.

General election

Secretary of the Commonwealth
Eleven-term Republican Incumbent Frederic W. Cook ran unopposed in the primary and defeated Democrat Joseph J. Buckley in the general election for Secretary of the Commonwealth.

Democratic primary
Joseph J. Buckley, a former WPA employee and a virtual unknown in politics, defeated Leo A. Gosselin in the Democratic primary.

General election

Treasurer and Receiver-General
Incumbent Republican Treasurer and Receiver-General William E. Hurley was constitutionally prevented from running for a fourth consecutive term. Democrat Francis X. Hurley defeated Republican Laurence Curtis to succeed Hurley.

Republican primary
State senator Laurence Curtis defeated former state senator Sybil Holmes, attorney Edgar A. French, Perennial candidate Wallace E. Stearns, and Boston finance commissioner Richard E. Johnston for the Republican nomination.

Democratic primary
Attorney and former Massachusetts Auditor Francis X. Hurley defeated former state representative Thomas E. Barry, Boston City Councilor William F. Hurley, and state auditor Thomas J. Buckley’s former confidential secretary John F. Welch to win the Democratic primary. Francis X. Hurley was the third consecutive person in 12 years named Hurley to be elected state treasurer, following Charles F. Hurley and William E. Hurley.

General Election

Auditor
Incumbent Democratic Auditor Thomas J. Buckley defeated his predecessor, Republican Russell A. Wood in the general election.

Democratic primary
Incumbent Thomas J. Buckley defeated assistant director of Boston’s Bureau of Americanization Leo D. Walsh in the Democratic primary.

General Election

Attorney General
Incumbent Attorney General Robert T. Bushnell (R) defeated former Boston city councilor and Massachusetts Fish and Game Commissioner James E. Agnew (D) to win reelection. Both won their parties’ nominations unopposed.

General Election

United States Senate 

Republican Incumbent Senator Henry Cabot Lodge Jr. defeated Democratic U.S. Representative Joseph E. Casey to win his second term.

United States House of Representatives

All of Massachusetts' fourteen seats in the United States House of Representatives were up for election in 1942. Republicans won 10 of the 14. Due to the loss of one congressional seat, the districts of Democrats, Thomas A. Flaherty and Thomas H. Eliot, were combined. Flaherty retired and Elliot lost renomination in the new Boston-based 11th congressional district to James Michael Curley. The Republicans gained a seat when Angier Goodwin won the seat previously held by Democrat Arthur Daniel Healey, who resigned when he was appointed to the United States District Court for the District of Massachusetts. Two other incumbents (Democrat Joseph E. Casey and Republican George H. Tinkham) also did not run for reelection and they were succeeded by members of their own party (Philip J. Philbin succeeded Casey in the Worcester County-based 3rd district and Christian Herter succeed Tinkham in the Boston-based 10th district).

See also
 153rd Massachusetts General Court (1943–1944)

References

External links

 
Massachusetts